Middlefield may refer to:

Canada
Middlefield, Nova Scotia
 Middlefield Collegiate Institute, a high school in the area
 Middlefield Road, a street in Toronto
 a community in Markham, Ontario

England
Middlefield, Stapleford, a mansion in Stapleford, Cambridgeshire

Scotland
Middlefield, Aberdeen, a place in Aberdeen
Middlefield, Falkirk, a U.K. location

United States
Middlefield, Connecticut
Middlefield, Massachusetts
Middlefield, New York 
Middlefield, Ohio
Middlefield station, a light rail station in Mountain View, California
Middlefield Township, Buchanan County, Iowa
Middlefield Township, Geauga County, Ohio